Mighty Tigers Football Club is a Malawian football (soccer) club based in Blantyre that currently plays in the TNM Super League, the top division of Malawian football.

History
It was founded in 1980 in the city of Blantyre with the name Admarc Tigers.

Stadium
Currently the team plays at the 3,000 capacity Kalulu Stadium.

Honours
Super League of Malawi 
 Winners (1): 1989
 Runners-up (1): 1986

Malawi FAM Cup
 Winners (1): 2009
 Runners-up (2): 2005, 2014

Chibuku Cup
 Winners (1): 1985

Kamuzu Cup
 Winners (2): 1988, 1990

Press Cup/Castle Cup
 Runners-up (1): 1994

Challenge 555 Cup
 Winners (1): 1984

BAT Sportsman Trophy
 Winners (1): 1984

References

External links
Club profile - Soccerway.com

Football clubs in Malawi